Storgrønningen is a lake in the municipality of Høylandet in Trøndelag county, Norway. The extreme southern tip of the lake crosses over the border into Overhalla municipality.

See also
List of lakes in Norway

References

Lakes of Trøndelag
Overhalla
Høylandet